Garage  (full title: GARAGE: Bad Dream Adventure; Japanese: ガラージュ) is a 1999 Japanese horror adventure video game developed by Kinotrope and published by Toshiba-EMI for Windows and Macintosh.

Plot and gameplay
Garage is a surreal and nightmarish point and click adventure inspired by the works of Carl Jung, set inside the mind of a man named Yang. Yang finds himself inside of a therapy machine known as Garage, which creates within the user's mind a dystopian world similar to Kowloon Walled City. The city is inhabited by biomechanical entities trapped on a web of tracks, repeating their days in a dark, patriarchal capitalist society. The player takes control of a small bio-machine tasked with finding its "shadow" - a mysterious entity which seems to reflect another facet of the player character themself - and to escape the city in the process. Along the way, the player must meet other machines, solve puzzles, fish for frogs, and balance their ever-dwindling supplies of Ego and Fuel. The game's graphics are pre-rendered and digitized.

Development
The game was written and designed by Japanese surrealist artist Tomomi Sakuba. It was also art-directed by Sakuba, produced by Masahiro Ikuta, co-produced by Akihiko Kawa, and programmed by Akiya Hayashi. Its 3D graphics were created by Gengo Ito and Hiroki Watanabe, with music composed by Tomonori Tanaka.

Sakuba began his interest in games with the Cyan, Inc. title Cosmic Osmo, which he had played around 1990. After learning that the game had been created in HyperCard, a software that was pre-installed for free on Mac computers at the time, he went to the library and began studying the software. He made a few experimental projects including Hobbit's Great Adventure and Talking before setting his sights on developing a full-fledged game.

When sketching out the design of the hero, Sakuba settled on a creature with an organic head on the body of a machine. He eventually decided to apply this design to all the characters. At least one poster was designed before the final poster was chosen for marketing. The official website for the game was published in August 1995, where the director maintained a diary of the game's progress.

Release
The first release of this game was limited to 3,000 copies. The game's publisher, Toshiba-EMI, withdrew from CD-ROM publishing before further copies could be produced. Even in Japan, where the game was released, original copies of Garage are considered extremely rare, with only a few thousand in existence. When a used copy of the game appeared on the trading site Suruga-ya, it initially had an asking price of 300,000 yen.

Its first availability on the internet can be attributed to members of the 4chan's retro gaming board, /vr/, who discovered it on an auction site, and pooled funds together in order to acquire and preserve it. The game's creator initially held resistance to republishing it, citing issues of "game balance," as well as his lack of rights to the property. A limited re-release, titled "Garage Private Edition," went on sale in mid-2007, and quickly sold out. With permission of Tomomi Sakuba, the game was a repackaging of the original release.

On December 10, 2021, a remastered version of Garage, titled Garage: Complete Version, was released on iOS and Android devices, being the first time the game would be officially playable in English - featuring UI and game balance improvements, new chapters, sidequests and multiple different endings. This version was later ported to Microsoft Windows, and released on Steam as Garage: Bad Dream Adventure on July 7, 2022.

Reception
Hardcore Gaming 101 deemed Garage a "profoundly uncomfortable game to look at", due to its unsettling nature.

Notes

References

External links
 Official website

1999 video games
Japan-exclusive video games
Classic Mac OS games
Point-and-click adventure games
Video games about robots
Video games developed in Japan
Windows games